Rzeczków may refer to the following places:
Rzeczków, Rawa County in Łódź Voivodeship (central Poland)
Rzeczków, Skierniewice County in Łódź Voivodeship (central Poland)
Rzeczków, Tomaszów Mazowiecki County in Łódź Voivodeship (central Poland)
Rzeczków, Masovian Voivodeship (east-central Poland)